Skolepovo is a rural locality (a village) in Mstyora Urban Settlement, Vyaznikovsky District, Vladimir Oblast, Russia. The population was 23 as of 2010.

Geography 
Skolepovo is located 22 km west of Vyazniki (the district's administrative centre) by road. Vyazovka is the nearest rural locality.

References 

Rural localities in Vyaznikovsky District